Yengejeh (also known as Yengeja and Yengejal) is a village in Abbas-e Gharbi Rural District, Tekmeh Dash District, Bostanabad County, East Azerbaijan Province, Iran. At the 2006 census, its population was 347, in 78 families.

References 

Populated places in Bostanabad County